The Eponym dating system was a calendar system for Assyria, for a period of over one thousand years. Every year was associated with the name, an eponym, of the Limmu, the official who led that year's New Year festival.

The dating system is thought to have originated in the ancient city of Assur, and remained the official dating system in Assyria until the end of the Assyrian Empire in the seventh century BC. The names of the Limmu who became eponyms were originally chosen by lot sortition, until the first millennium it became a fixed rotation of officers headed by the king who constituted the limmu. The earliest known attestations of a year eponyms are at Karum-Kanesh, and became used in other Assyrian colonies in Anatolia. Its spread was due to Shamshi-Adad I's unification of northern Mesopotamia.

Old Assyrian eponym lists 
A number of Old Assyrian limmu lists have been combined into the so-called Revised Eponym List (REL), which spans a period of 255 years in the early second millennium BCE (1972-1718 BCE in the Middle Chronology dating system). The central figure of this period was Šamšī-Adad I who conquered Aššur in the year REL 165, and reigned Assyria until his death in REL 197. In the Middle Chronology system his reign corresponds to the years 1808-1776 BCE.

The absolute chronology of this period has long been controversial. That the Middle Chronology is indeed correct, and not one of the rival absolute chronologies, is supported by a combined dendrochronological (tree-ring) and radiocarbon (14C) data analysis, which narrows down the year Šamšī-Adad died to between 1776 and 1768 BCE. In addition, it is known that in the year after his birth (ca. REL 127) a partial solar eclipse was observed, and this fits in with an eclipse on August 5, 1845 BCE.

Late Assyrian eponym lists 

With the establishment of eponym lists, succinct statements about events were sometimes added in order to keep track of the sequence. The most well-known limmu lists run from 911 through to 631 BC, and have been dated with the aid of the Canon of Ptolemaeus, which coincides with dates from the Canon between 747 and 631 BC. According to one limmu list, a solar eclipse occurred in the tenth reigning year of the Assyrian king Aššur-dan II, in the month of Sivan (May–June on the Gregorian calendar), by Bur-Sagale. Using the Canon of Kings the tenth year can be dated to 763 BC, and modern astronomy dating has backed the Assyrian eclipse up as June 15, 763 BC. Other events can be dated from this establishment of fact, such as the taking of the Egyptian city of Thebes by the Assyrians in 664 BC, and to be able to determine the date of the minting of ancient coins.

Out of 19 surviving clay tablets with limmus, they between them show ten manuscripts that contain lists of years identified by the eponym with a summary note about what happened that year, most often military campaigns. Thus, such lists provide historians a way of dating long stretches of the Neo-Assyrian history, and give us in details military exploits and which were considered the most important. Such a translation can be found below (With BC added).

See also
 Eponymous archon
 Roman consular dating
 Chronology of the ancient Near East

References

Bibliography
The Eponyms of the Assyrian Empire, Alan Millard.
A History of the Ancient Near East ca. 3000-323 BC, second edition, Marc Van de Mieroop.
Ancient Iraq, Georges Roux.

External links
 On dating a list of names  [This includes annotated copies of the Assyrian Eponym List.]

Assyrian culture
Calendars